Santiago South Regional Football Association (Portuguese: Associação Regional de Futebol de Santiago Sul, abbreviation: ARFSS, not commonly as ARFSZS) is a football (soccer) association covering the south of the island of Santiago, it is an affiliate of the Cape Verdean Football Federation.  It is headquartered in the city of Praia.   The association covers the municipalities of Praia, Ribeira Grande de Santiago and São Domingos.

The season features 12 clubs in the premier division for the second time, Varanda and Delta were relegated into the Second Division, Tchadense and Benfica were promoted last season.  In the second division, it is another season featuring ten clubs, two new clubs competed for the first time, Relâmpago and Tira Chapêu.

Logo
Its logo has an edged crescented crest and features a football (soccer ball) and on the bottom are the Portuguese language acronym ARFSS.

History
Santiago was the first island league to feature a second division league, it was once known as the second level. It was founded in 2002 after the Santiago Island League was split into two.  The south zone would have its seat in Praia. When it was created it wholly covered the Praia until the formation or Ribeira Grande de Santiago in 2005 that split the western part of the municipality.  In 2010, clubs from the municipality of São Domingos started to play with the association.  Until 2014-15 it had a total of 20 clubs, each had ten clubs, later two were added to the Premier Division totalling 12 and eight clubs played in the Second Division for the 2015-16 season.  Two additional registered clubs started to play in the lowest division for the 2016-17 season and now totals ten with 22 overall.

Organization
The association also organizes and functions the regional championships, the Cup, the Super Cup and the Opening Tournament.  The association has 22 registered clubs, Sporting and Boavista are pro-clubs.  The regional champion competes in the National Championships each season, once did in the cup (2007) and super cup (2013) competition who competed at the national level. The regional championships has two divisions

Santiago South Premier Division (12 clubs)
Santiago South Second Division (10 clubs)

Registered clubs
The region's registered clubs as of late 2016 include.

 Académica da Praia - Premier Division
 ADESBA - Craveiro Lopes neighborhood, Praia - Premier Division
 Asa Grande - Achada Grande (Leite (where the club is based) and Tras) - Second Division
 Benfica da Praia - Premier Division
 Boavista Praia - Premier Division
 Celtic da Praia - Achadina de Baixo neighborhood, Praia - Premier Division
 Delta - Praia - Second Division
 Desportivo da Praia - Premier Division
 Calabaceira Fiorentina - Calabaceira neighborhood, Praia - Second Division
 Os Garridos - São Domingos - Second Division
 Kumunidadi/Kumunidade - Second Division
 Eugénio Lima FC - based in the homonymous neighborhood, Praia - Premier Division
 Relâmpago - Second Division
 Ribeira Grande de Santiago - Cidade Velha - Second Division
 Sporting Praia - Premier Division
 Tchadense - Achada Santo Antônio neighborhood - Premier Division
 AD Tira Chapéu - based in the homonymous neighborhood - also serves the west of Praia - Premier Division
 Travadores - Praia - Premier Division
 Unidos do Norte (União dos Norte) - Achada Grande Tras, Paiol, Achada São Filipe and the north of Praia - Second Division
 Varanda - Craveiro Lopes neighborhood, Praia - Second Division
 GDRC Vila Nova (Vilanova) - based in the homonymous neighborhood and covers the north of Praia - Second Division
 Vitória - Praia - Second Division

Former clubs
Andorinha - São Domingos, now part of Os Garridos
Associação Juvenil Black Panthers - late 2000s

Clubs before it became merged
Avenida 77 - now part of Benfica da Praia
Jentabus - now part of Benfica da Praia
Paiol - now part of Unidos do Norte
Praia Rural - now part of Unidos do Norte

References

External links
Official website 
Santiago South Regional Football Association page at Facebook 
History of ARFSS at Facebook 
Santiago South Regional Football Association at Konkuri - includes the championship results of the Premier and Second Divisions

Association football governing bodies in Cape Verde
Sport in Praia
2003 establishments in Cape Verde